The 2013 United Tournament was an exhibition football club tournament that took place in Ukraine and Russia on 27 June – 7 July 2013. Four teams participated in it: Shakhtar Donetsk and Dynamo Kyiv from Ukraine; Zenit St. Petersburg and Spartak Moscow from Russia. On 7 July 2013, Dynamo Kyiv beat Spartak Moscow 2–1 and won this tournament.

Each team played four matches: both a home and away fixture against the two teams from the opposing country. The teams didn't play against their domestic rivals. Zenit St. Petersburg played their home matches in Kyiv, as their Petrovsky Stadium was under renovation works. The tiebreakers were: head-to-head results over the two legs, the aggregate goal difference. In total, 8 substitutions were allowed, but the additional five must take place at half time.

Teams

Venues

Standings

Matches

Winners

See also 
Channel One Cup
Super Cup of Champions
Match World Cup
Spartak Moscow–Dynamo Kyiv derby

References 

United Tournament
United Tournament
United Tournament